Darin Fenton (born c. 1968) is a Canadian curler.

Teams

References

External links
 
 Darin Fenton – Curling Canada Stats Archive

Living people
Canadian male curlers
Curlers from British Columbia
World curling champions
Brier champions
1960s births